The Grammy Award for Best Gospel Performance, Contemporary was awarded from 1978 to 1983.  From 1978 to 1982 it was titled the Grammy Award for Best Gospel Performance Contemporary or Inspirational. Before and after this time from 1968 to 1977 and from 2005 this category was a part of the Grammy Award for Best Gospel/Contemporary Christian Music Performance.

Years reflect the year in which the Grammy Awards were presented, for works released in the previous year.

Recipients

References

Grammy Awards for gospel music